In enzymology, a dTDP-4-dehydrorhamnose reductase is an enzyme that catalyzes the chemical reaction

dTDP-6-deoxy-L-mannose + NADP+  dTDP-4-dehydro-6-deoxy-L-mannose + NADPH + H+

Thus, the two substrates of this enzyme are dTDP-6-deoxy-L-mannose and NADP+, whereas its 3 products are dTDP-4-dehydro-6-deoxy-L-mannose, NADPH, and H+.

This enzyme belongs to the family of oxidoreductases, specifically those acting on the CH-OH group of donor with NAD+ or NADP+ as acceptor. The systematic name of this enzyme class is dTDP-6-deoxy-L-mannose:NADP+ 4-oxidoreductase. Other names in common use include dTDP-4-keto-L-rhamnose reductase, reductase, thymidine diphospho-4-ketorhamnose, dTDP-4-ketorhamnose reductase, TDP-4-keto-rhamnose reductase, and thymidine diphospho-4-ketorhamnose reductase. This enzyme participates in 3 metabolic pathways: nucleotide sugars metabolism, streptomycin biosynthesis, and polyketide sugar unit biosynthesis.

Structural studies

References

 

EC 1.1.1
NADPH-dependent enzymes
Enzymes of known structure